Ambulyx auripennis is a species of moth in the family Sphingidae. It was described by Frederic Moore in 1879 and is known from Sri Lanka.

It is similar to Ambulyx substrigilis, but the underside of the body is deeper yellow and the markings on the wing are less conspicuous.

References

Ambulyx
Moths described in 1879
Moths of Sri Lanka